Émile Maruéjouls (4 August 1835 – 22 October 1908) was a French politician of the Third French Republic. He was minister of commerce, industries, posts and telegraphs (1898) in the government of Henri Brisson and minister of public works (1902–1905) in the government of Émile Combes.

References

Sources 
 « Émile Maruéjouls », dans le Dictionnaire des parlementaires français (1889-1940), sous la direction de Jean Jolly, PUF, 1960.

External links
 Fiche sur le site de l'Assemblée nationale

1835 births
1908 deaths
People from Villefranche-de-Rouergue
Politicians from Occitania (administrative region)
Radical Party (France) politicians
French Ministers of Commerce
Members of the 5th Chamber of Deputies of the French Third Republic
Members of the 6th Chamber of Deputies of the French Third Republic
Members of the 7th Chamber of Deputies of the French Third Republic
Members of the 8th Chamber of Deputies of the French Third Republic
Members of the 9th Chamber of Deputies of the French Third Republic